T. K. Doraiswamy (21 August 1921 – 17 May 2007), also known by his pen name Nakulan, was an Indian poet, professor of English, novelist, translator and short fiction writer, who wrote both in Tamil and English, and is known for his surrealism and experimentation as well as free verse. He served as Professor of English, Mar Ivanios College, Thiruvananthapuram for four decades.

During his literary career which started in his forties, when he started writing in Ezhuthu, a literary magazine founded by C. S. Chellappa, he wrote a novel and six books of poems in English, and nine novels and five books of poems in Tamil. His English work was mostly published under his real name, while Tamil works often appeared under his pen name. He also wrote briefly under the pen name, S. Nayar(sp?). His symbolic novel Ninaivup Patai Nilakal (1972) is considered a milestone in Tamil literature and established him as an avant garde novelist. His other notable works in Tamil include, Nizhalgal, Naykal, Naveenante Diary Kurippukal, Ezhuthu Kavithaikal, Iruneenda Kavithaikal, Antha Manchal Nira Poonaikutty, and in English, Words to the Wind, 'Non-Being' and 'A Tamil Writer's Journal'.

He received the Asan Memorial Award for Tamil Poetry in 1983.

Early life and education
Born in 1921, in Kumbakonam, in Thanjavur district, Tamil Nadu, Prof. Doraiswamy moved to Thiruvananthapuram at age 14.

Later he completed his MA in Tamil from Annamalai University, followed by M.A. in English from University of Kerala. He had an M.Phil. in Literature on Virginia Woolf's work.

Career

He started serious writing only in 1960s, and was encouraged in pursuing the art by his good friend Kaa Naa Subramoniam.  Many of Nakulan's students acknowledge that he initiated them into the art of writing good poetry. He was widely read. He quietly influenced countless writers and artists who visited his house at Golf Links, Kaudiar, and had discussions with him, especially the young ones. Equally distinguished as a poet, translator, critic, anthologist, novelist and short fiction writer, his publications include a novel and six books of poems in English and nine novels and five books of poems in Tamil. His alter-ego Naveenan in his Tamil novels stands out as a modernist anti-hero who was perhaps the first of his kind in Tamil literature. He was one of the first writers to attempt techniques like stream of consciousness in Tamil literature ably. His use of the diary form in his novels like " Naveenan's Diary Jottings" was based on his admiration for the spirituality, philosophy and theology of the twentieth century (modern) mystic Simone Weil rather than influenced by writers like Anaïs Nin.

His only novel in English was called "Words for the Wind." (1973). His English poetry collections include "Words to the Listening Air," "Non – Being" and "A Tamil Writer's Journal I, II and III". He wrote a long poem in English called "Raja Vembala." His short stories were frequently published by Pritish Nandy in the Illustrated Weekly of India. He has translated James Joyce, T. S. Eliot and K. Ayyappa Paniker, to name just a few. His best translation work may be the book  "The Little Sparrow" in which he devotes himself entirely to the great Subramania Bharati's writing.

Although the influence of James Joyce was pronounced in his writings, it was more the metaphysical and religious thrust similar to T. S. Eliot's and the spareness of style of a Samuel Beckett that really made his works stand out. He was definitely a late Modernist moving into the realm of Post-Modernism. He never compromised in his writing or his life on what was expected of an artist.

He retired as Professor of English, Mar Ivanios College, Thiruvananthapuram (University of Kerala) after serving for four decades, and started full-time freelance writing. His best known novels are Ninaivu Pathai, Naaikal (Dogs) and Vaakku Moolam (Confession).

He was awarded the Asan Memorial Award for Tamil Poetry in 1983, and several other literary awards.

Personal life
He was a bachelor. He died on 17 May 2007, at Thiruvananthapuram, at the age of 86. He had looked after his parents till they died and so their domestic help Purthai took care of him till the very end.

Works
 English
 Words for the Wind. Writers Workshop, 1973. (as T.K. Doraiswamy)
 Routes of Evanescence: a cycle of poems. Samkaleen Prakashan, 1981.
 That Little Sparrow: poems from Subramanya Bharati, with Paratiyar. Zha Publications, 1982.
 A Tamil Writer's Journal I & II. Publisher: T.K. Duraiswamy, 1984.
 Words to the Listening Air. Atri Publishers.
 Non- Being
 Tamil Short stories
 Oru raathal irachi
 Hippies
 Oru naal
 Tamil
 Nillakal. Publisher Tamilp Puttakalayam, 1965.
 Kurukshetram: oru ilakkiyat tokuppu. Publisher Vir̲panai urimai, Tamil̲ Puttakālayam, 1968.
 Ninaivup patai. Publisher	Tas Puk Centar, 1972.
 Nāykal. Publisher	Turaicāmi, 1974.
 Navinaan tayari: naval. Publisher	Ilakkiyac Kankam, 1978.
 Mūnru: kavitaikal. Publisher Turaicami, 1979.
 Aintu: kavitaikal. Publisher T.K. Doraiswamy, 1981.
 Kotstānt kavitaikal. Publisher La Veliyitu, 1981.
 Ivarkal. Publisher Narmata, 1983.
 Curuti. Publisher	Tarani Patippakam, 1987.
 Gramam: nōval. Publisher	Sahityapr̲avarttaka Sahakaranasangham, 1991.
 Iru ninta kavitaikal. Publisher Virutcam, 1991.
 Vakkumulam. 1992.
 Nakulan̲ kataikal. Kavya, 1998.
 Nakulan kavithaikal (Selected poems). Ed. Sudalaimuthu Shanmugasundaram. Publisher Kavyā, 2001.
 Nakulan̲ katturaikal. Publisher Kavya, 2002.
 Kannadiyahum kangal, ed. R. R. Srinivasan. Kāvyā, 2006.
 Nakulan Novelkal — Collection of Eight Novels of Nakulan. Kaavya, 2006.

Notes

See also
 List of Indian writers

References

Further reading

External links
 Nakulan – a few poems (Tamil with English Translation)
 Nakulan in Tamil
 Writer Nakulan – Works, Collections, Poems, Memoirs (In Tamil)

Tamil-language writers
Academic staff of the University of Kerala
1921 births
2007 deaths
Tamil writers
Tamil poets
Writers from Thiruvananthapuram
University of Kerala alumni
Indian male novelists
20th-century Indian translators
English-language poets from India
Indian male short story writers
Annamalai University alumni
Scholars from Thiruvananthapuram
20th-century Indian poets
20th-century Indian novelists
Indian male poets
20th-century Indian short story writers
Novelists from Kerala
Novelists from Tamil Nadu
People from Thanjavur district
20th-century Indian male writers